Zia Gurchani is a Pakistani television actor and writer. He used to host a children's programme from Radio Pakistan in the early 2000s. Zia was introduced to the showbiz industry by journalist Zafar Samdani. His television appearances include Aangan (2017), Yaqeen Ka Safar (2017), Alif Allah Aur Insaan (2017–18), Mah-e-Tamaam (2018), Nibah (2018), Romeo Weds Heer (2018–19), Dil Kiya Karey (2019–present).

Personal life
Gurchani is from Quetta, Balochistan. He is the brother of veteran actor Jahanzeb Gurchani who appeared in PTV Home's classic Urdu serials in the 1990s.

Television

References

External links 

Living people
Year of birth missing (living people)